The Église de la Sainte-Trinité is a Roman Catholic church located on Place D'Etienne d'Orves, at 3 rue de la Trinité, in the 9th arrondissement of Paris. It was built between 1861 and 1867 during the reign of Emperor Napoleon III, in the residential neighborhood of the Chaussée d'Antin. It is in the ornate Neo-Renaissance or Second Empire Style, with a highly visible 65-meter-tall belfry.

The church is accessible by the Métro (the nearby station, Trinité, is named after it).The rue de La Trinité and the square de La Trinité also take their names from the church.

History
The first church in the parish, which was then outside the city limits of Paris, was constucted en 1850 at 21 rue de Calais, but was too small for growing population and too far from the center of the parish. A second church was built in 1852 on the rue de Clichy, where the presnt-day Casino de Paris is located, but it also was too small. The Abbé Modelonde, the curé of the parish, appealed to Napoleon III to construct a larger new church. 

The church was part of the massive campaign for rebuilding and beautifying  Paris carried out by Napoleon III and his prefect of the Seine, Baron Haussmann during the Second French Empire. This included the creation of new boulevards, parks and squares, and new landmarks such as the Paris Opera. The church and other new buildings Napoleon IIi commissioned were designed to be tall and visible, and were placed at the meeting points of the new avenues that criss-crossed the city.

The architect was Théodore Ballu, chief architect of Paris for religious buildings, whose other Paris works included the restoration of the Saint-Jacques Tower, (1854–58); the belfry of  Saint-Germain-l'Auxerrois (1858–63); and the Église Saint-Ambroise, (1863–69). Construction began in 1861 and was largely completed by 1867,but it was not entirely finished and consecrated until 1913. 

In the winter of 1870-71, when Paris was surrounded and besieged by the Prussians in the Franco-Prussian War, the church was put to use as a hospital, since it was one of the few large Paris buildings with a working furnace.  A large stove was also placed in the nave, which darkened  the ceiling with its smoke. The chapels were turned into a pharmacy, linen closet, laundry and  storerooms, and a  large stove was placed in the nave to provide additional heat.  

During the Paris Commune, on 12 May 1871, the building was confiscated from the Catholic church  and used as a meeting hall for a club of Communard women called the Club of Deliverance.  During the Semaine Sanglante, the final battle of the Commune, the furniture was piled up and the church was armed as a Commune fortress, but the Commundards were forced to withdraw when the church was bypassed by the advancing French army.   

The church had a particular connection with French 19th century music:  The organist of the church was French composer Olivier Messiaen. It was the location of Gioachino Rossini's funeral, on 13 November 1868; Hector Berlioz's funeral, on 11 March 1869; and Georges Bizet's funeral in 1875.

The church's facade served as the inspiration for the design of the Saint-Jean-Baptiste Church in Quebec City and the Cathedral of the Blessed Sacrament in Sacramento, California.

Exterior 
The exterior of the church has elements of French Renaissance architecture combined with Italian Renaissance architecture, which were often joined in imaginative ways during the reign of Napoleon III. The most impressive feature is the bell tower, 65 meters high. The lower bell tower is square, topped by an octagonal tower crowned by a dome, in the style of French Renaissance architecture. The facade is given symmetry and harmony by two smaller domed bell towers on the corners.

The sculptures in the niches of the facade were made by different prominent Paris artists, most of whom were winners of the prestigious Prix de Rome.  One group  depicts depict doctors of the church defending it against various heresies; another grouop depicts, Saints. Groups of statues on either side of the facade depict the Cardinal Virtues, Prudence, Justice, Temperance and Force. The statue of "Strength", is by sculptor James Pradier(1792-1852), and carries a sword on his right side. "Temperance" was made by Jean-Baptiste Carpeaux (1827-1875)

Interior 
The 93-meter-long church has an iron frame, which allowed much greater open space in the interior. The interior is lavishly decorated, a feature enhanced by the large windows on the upper level made with a minimum of colored glass and a majority of white decor glass, which provide abundant light. Polychrome paintings decorate much of the top level, contrasting with the white walls and columns of the lower level, and the entire interior has lavish sculptural decoration.

The Nave
The nave has two levels. The lower level is decorated with pillars alongside composite columns. Each column has two statues of apostles, dentified by their symbols. The second level has a tribune which was originally intended for the use of Emperor Napoleon III. Over the tribune is a triuphal arch painted with a scene from the Apocalypse described by Saint John, "Christ and the Easter Lamb," by the painter Jobbé-Duval. 

THe nave is lined on both sides by small chapels, each with abundant decoration. The sculpture and paintings in the chapels are the work of Paris artists, the majority of whom had studied their art at the Academy in Rome run by the French Academy in Rome.  Paris.

The carvings of the pulpit in the nave were made by the artist Denuelle. It is similar to the pulpit in the church of Saint-François-Xavier, Paris, from the same period.

The Choir
The choir is ten steps higher than the nave, due to the sloping site under the church, and is surrounded by an ambulatory. The central element of the choir is an immense main altar, created by Puissielgue-Rusand, who also built the altar for the church of Saint-Francois-Xavier in Paris. It is surrounded by ten columns, representing the Ten Commandments. In front of the altar, on a high stand, is a more modern crucifix. made in 1992 by the sculptor Philippe Kaeppelin. 

Over the altar is an arch with a monumental painting by Barrias, illustrating the Holy Trinity. The center figure of God the Father in enveloping with his cloak figures of Christ and the Holy Ghost.

The Chapels 
The largest chapel is the Chapel of the Virgin, placed in the traditional location in the apse directly behind the altar, facing the morning son, and accessed by an ambulatory. 

A series of small chapels are placed in the arcades on either side of the choir, each one decorated with classical paintings by artists from the Academy of Fine Arts. The artists who decorated the church chapels went on to decorate many of the new churches builf in the 19th century.

Art and decoration

Paintings
Paintings by several of he the major French history and religion  painters of the 19th century, including Désiré François Laugée, and Jean-Jules-Antoine Lecomte du Nouÿ are found in the church. The decoration continues on the upper walls and the vaults, filling them with colors and floral designs.

Sculpture
The church has many works made by prominent Paris sculptors both on the exterior and in the church. The sculptures of Charles Gumery, who created  a marble Virgin Mary for the holy water basins at the church entrance, also made statues for the facade of the Opera Garnier, the new Paris Opera.  His statue of Circe is displayed on the south façade of the Cour Carrée in the Louvre Museum (1860)

Stained Glass
The church has a particularly notable collection of 19th century stained glass. The most prominent windows are those in the Chapel of the Virgin. The upper windows in the chapel were made by Eugene Oudinot and Auguste Leloir, and illustrate scenes from the life of the Virgin. The lower windows behind the altar are more abstract and full of color; they were made by the glass master craftsman Nicod.

Decoration

Organs

La Trinité features two organs, a Cavaillé-Coll chancel organ and a Cavaillé-Coll grand organ located in the balcony. The latter instrument has been extensively renovated and expanded over the decades:

 1869 Original construction by the Cavaillé-Coll firm
 1871 Reconstruction and repairs by the Cavaillé-Coll firm after damages incurred during the Paris Commune of 1870
 1901 Rebuilding by Merklin
 1934 Rebuilding by the Pleyel-Cavaillé-Coll firm
 1962–65 Rebuilding by the Beuchet-Debierre firm

The current specifications of the grand organ are:

Organists
The French composer Olivier Messiaen (1908-1992) entered the Paris Conservatory at the age of eleven, and was appointed organist at the church in 1931, at the age of twenty-eight. He held the post for  61 years until his death in 1992. During this period he wrote many of his most important works.  

The titular organists at La Trinité include
 Charles-Alexis Chauvet (1869-1871)
 Alexandre Guilmant (1871–1901)
 Charles Quef (1901–1931)
 Olivier Messiaen (1931–1992)
 Naji Hakim (1993–2008)
  (since 1999)
 Loïc Mallié (since 2011)

Notes and Citations

Bibliography (in French) 
Dumoulin, Aline; Ardisson, Alexandra; Maingard, Jérôme; Antonello, Murielle; Églises de Paris (2010), Éditions Massin, Issy-Les-Moulineaux,  (in French)

See Also 
 List of historic churches in Paris

External links

 L’Église de la Trinité home page
  Article in patrimoine-histoire.fr, on the history and art of the church

Churches completed in 1867
19th-century Roman Catholic church buildings in France
Eglise de la Sainte-Trinite
1867 establishments in France